Charles Oliver Bell (18 May 1894 – 5 June 1939) was a footballer and manager.

Birth

There is some uncertainty over the details of Charlie Bell's birth. Some sources report him as being born in Dumfries in Scotland, although RSSSF states that he was born in Cambridge in England.

Playing career

He started his footballing career as a junior with Dumfries Wanderers and after a short spell at Castle Douglas side, Douglas Wanderers, he decided to move down south, signing for Carlisle City. He then played for other clubs south of the border, namely Woolwich Arsenal, Chesterfield, Barrow and Queens Park Rangers in a career impacted by World War I.

Coaching and management

After coaching jobs at Sporting Clube de Portugal, Reading and Notts County, he became a full-time manager at Wigan Borough. He left England for Italy, where he coached Padova from 1927 to 1928. He came back to Lisbon with Sporting Clube de Portugal in 1928. In 1932, he was the first Marseille manager in the newly founded French professional football championship. In France, he had also a stint at Nice.

He came back to England in 1935, with Mansfield Town and then managed Bournemouth for three years.

Honours 
Sporting CP
Lisbon Championship: 1921–22

 Marseille
 Division 1 Group A: 1932–33 Runners up

Death

He died soon after, aged 45 in Bournemouth.

References

External links
Soccerbase statistics 

1894 births
1939 deaths
Scottish footballers
Scottish football managers
Arsenal F.C. players
Chesterfield F.C. players
Barrow A.F.C. players
Queens Park Rangers F.C. players
Sporting CP managers
Calcio Padova managers
Olympique de Marseille managers
OGC Nice managers
Mansfield Town F.C. managers
AFC Bournemouth managers
Wigan Borough F.C. managers
Footballers from Dumfries
Scottish expatriate football managers
Scottish expatriate sportspeople in Portugal
Association football forwards